An online art gallery is an online version of a contemporary art gallery.

Purpose and type
An online art gallery is a website that display artworks.  Usually, the online gallery is run as a business, with the purpose of displaying the artwork being to promote it to potential buyers.  Other variations include:
 An online art market for collectors also known as an online secondary market. 
 A contemporary art gallery displaying art work from their current, future, or past exhibitions, most often to promote the exhibitions, rather than with a view to selling the work via the website . 
 An artist hosting their own gallery, either on their own website or on other websites.  This approach is usually adopted with a view to increasing the percentage of the sale price the artist themselves receive.
 There are a number of online galleries that represent many artists working in different media and genre. The artist either pays a monthly fee or agrees to a commission paid when the work is sold. These are usually non-exclusive and are therefore a risk free opportunity for the artist to sell their work worldwide. They can be found by using search terms such as "original art" or "online art gallery".

Viewing art online
Viewing art online is an improving experience.  Ideally, art should appear exactly as it would if seen in the real world, but there are factors that limit the extent to which this is possible.  Factors include:
 Whether or not natural lighting can be approximated
 The extent to which a viewer is able to see the art from various angles i.e. other than head-on
 The impact on art that uses layering or raised effects when it is not viewable as a three-dimensional object

The increased adoption of broadband, and improvement in web programming techniques opens up the opportunity for improved display of art online.  Whilst no online gallery yet uses light filtering effects, and 3d photography is not yet available, much richer images and improved display techniques provide the viewer with a much richer experience.

The viewer may be offered the option of zooming such that the texture or pigmentation may be examined. Also in some cases the size of the work can be better appreciated by showing it alongside an image of a person of average height.

Another advantage of Online Galleries is that the art buying public is broadening but people are still somewhat intimidated by most commercial Art Galleries. They think they know nothing about art and I believe that in some cases this disadvantages the sales of some artists. If the potential buyer has access to a wide range of art that they can view in the comfort and safety of their own home they will tend to look a bit deeper and get to know what and who they like.

Associated facilities
Online galleries often form part of a wider online operation, with other popular facilities including:
 blogs
 news
 reviews
 events listings
 pricing information
 gallery listings
 forums
 desired framing
 collaboration 
 remote accessibility

Organizations
Bluethumb Art Gallery
Saatchi Art
UGallery
Artsonia 
Kid Art Show

See also
 Art exhibition
 Artist-run initiative
 Artist-run space
 Arts centre
 Contemporary art gallery
 List of notable museums and galleries
 List of national galleries
 Vanity gallery

References

Types of art museums and galleries
Online art gallery